River monster may refer to:

 Hudson River Monster, a creature in New York folklore
 Northern Kentucky River Monsters, a professional indoor football team
 River Monsters, a wildlife documentary television series
 White River Monster, a creature in Arkansas folklore

See also 

 Lake monster
 List of piscine and amphibian humanoids
 List of water deities
 Monster (disambiguation)
 Sea monster
 Water monster (disambiguation)
 Water spirit